The 102nd United States Congress began on January 3, 1991. There were three new senators (one Democrat, two Republicans) and 43 new representatives (24 Democrats, 18 Republicans, one independent), as well as one new delegate (a Democrat) at the start of the first session. Additionally, six senators (five Democrats, one Republican) and nine representatives (five Democrats, four Republicans) took office on various dates in order to fill vacancies during the 102nd Congress before it ended on January 3, 1993.

Senate

Took office January 3, 1991

Took office during the 102nd Congress

House of Representatives

Took office January 3, 1991

Non-voting delegates

Took office during the 102nd Congress

Non-voting delegates

See also 
List of United States senators in the 102nd Congress
List of members of the United States House of Representatives in the 102nd Congress by seniority

Notes

References 

102nd United States Congress
102